France Avenue is a major street in Minneapolis, Edina, and Bloomington, with shorter segments in several other suburbs (Brooklyn Park, Brooklyn Center, Robbinsdale, and Golden Valley) in the Minneapolis–Saint Paul metro area.

Route description 

The longest portion of France Avenue begins at the Minnesota River in Bloomington. County Road 17 begins at Old Shakopee Road. It crosses MN-62, and ends at the junction with Excelsior Boulevard at the border of Minneapolis and St. Louis Park. This portion of France Avenue includes the Southdale commercial district in Edina, and the 50th and France commercial district at the border of Minneapolis and Edina.

Between Excelsior Boulevard and W 54th Street, France Avenue designates the western border of Minneapolis.

Major intersections

References 

Bloomington, Minnesota
Edina, Minnesota
Streets in Minneapolis